Advaita Ashram -  the ashrams in Aluva, founded  in 1913 Sree Narayana Guru . Here he also established a Sanskrit school to restore the sanctity of the language through which universal spiritual teachings can be grasped and imparted to dedicated disciples.

In 1921, Narayana Guru presided over the annual meeting of the All Kerala Association of Brotherhood, held at Ashram. It was here that he proclaimed the message Whatever may be the differences in man's creed, dress, language etc... because they all belong to the same kind of creation, there is no harm in dining together or having marital relations with one another.

See also
 Narayana Guru
 Sree Narayana Dharma Paripalana Yogam (SNDP)
 Sree Narayana Trust
 Sivagiri, Kerala

External links
 SNDP website
 THE APOSTLE OF SOCIAL EQUALITY by Dr. K.I. Vasu
 Centenary celebration in Aluva – where Narayana Guru found peace

Ashrams
Narayana Guru
Religious buildings and structures in Ernakulam district
Religious organizations established in 1913
Advaita Vedanta
1913 establishments in India